Eois hulaquina is a moth in the  family Geometridae. It is found in Panama.

References

Moths described in 1914
Eois
Moths of Central America